Barrel of a Gun or Gun Barrel may refer to:

 Barrel of a Gun (Depeche Mode song)
 Barrel of a Gun (Guster song)
 Gun Barrel (band)
 Gun barrel
 Gunbarrel Highway
 Gun barrel sequence
 Gun Barrel City, Texas
The Barrel of a Gun, documentary about Mumia Abu-Jamal by Tigre Hill